The 1994 NCAA Division I softball season, play of college softball in the United States organized by the National Collegiate Athletic Association (NCAA) at the Division I level, began in February 1994. The season progressed through the regular season, many conference tournaments and championship series, and concluded with the 1994 NCAA Division I softball tournament and 1994 Women's College World Series. The Women's College World Series, consisting of the eight remaining teams in the NCAA Tournament and held in Oklahoma City at ASA Hall of Fame Stadium, ended on May 30, 1994.

Conference standings

Women's College World Series
The 1994 NCAA Women's College World Series took place from May 26 to May 30, 1994 in Oklahoma City.

Season leaders
Batting
Batting average: .588 – Sara Graziano, Coastal Carolina Chanticleers
RBIs: 95 – Laura Espinoza, Arizona Wildcats
Home runs: 30 – Laura Espinoza, Arizona Wildcats

Pitching
Wins: 36-11 – Maureen Brady, Fresno State Bulldogs
ERA: 0.36 (10 ER/194.0 IP) – Amy Windmiller, Cal State Northridge Matadors
Strikeouts: 359 – DeeDee Weiman, UCLA Bruins

Records
NCAA Division I season batting average:
.588 – Sara Graziano, Coastal Carolina Chanticleers

NCAA Division I season SEASON stolen bases:
80 – Michelle Ward, East Carolina Pirates

NCAA Division I season of perfect stolen bases:
48-48 – Angel McNamara, Morgan State Bears

NCAA Division I season complete games:
62 – Jessica Accord, Santa Clara Broncos

Junior class 7 inning single game strikeouts:
19 – Michelle Collins, Virginia Cavaliers; April 5, 1994

Sophomore class perfect games:
4 – Terri Kobata, Notre Dame Fighting Irish & Audrey West, Boston Terriers

Sophomore class no-hitters:
8 – Terri Kobata, Notre Dame Fighting Irish

Sophomore class season of perfect stolen bases:
33-33 – Cora Williams, Morgan State Bears

Team single game walks:
26 – Austin Peay Governors, February 24, 1994

Team single game stolen bases:
17 – Nicholls Colonels, April 1, 1994

Awards
Honda Sports Award Softball:
Susie Parra, Arizona Wildcats

All America Teams
The following players were members of the All-American Teams.

First Team

Second Team

Third Team

References